The 2019 Judo Grand Prix Tbilisi were held in Tbilisi, Georgia, from 29 to 31 March 2019.

Medal summary

Men's events

Women's events

Source Results

Medal table

References

External links
 

2019 IJF World Tour
2019 Judo Grand Prix
Grand Prix 2019
Judo
Judo
Judo